Jutz is a surname. Notable people with this surname include:

 Jakob Jutz (1915–1951), Swiss long-distance runner
 Thomm Jutz (born 1969), German-born American singer, songwriter, producer, and guitar player

See also
 Lutz
 Putz (surname)